Racing Victoria Limited, as the governing principal racing authority, has responsibilities to develop, encourage, promote and manage the conduct of Thoroughbred horse racing in the State of Victoria, Australia. It assumed this responsibility, from the Victoria Racing Club, on 19 December 2001.

It was established with the support of Country Racing Victoria, Melbourne Racing Club, Moonee Valley Racing Club, Victoria Racing Club, other racing industry bodies, and the Victorian State Government.

Racing Victoria represents the Victorian Thoroughbred industry in dealings with bodies such as the Australian Racing Board, and is responsible for the marketing of Victorian Thoroughbred racing.

The constitutional objectives of Racing Victoria include:

Ensuring that race meetings are managed and conducted to the highest integrity.
Management of revenues, costs, assets and liabilities to optimise economic benefits for Victoria.
Meeting its social obligations by encouraging responsible wagering and gaming.
Exercising its powers to ensure public confidence and independence from any improper external influence.

References

External links
RVL website
CRV website

Horse racing organisations in Australia
Sports governing bodies in Victoria (Australia)